The Serbian monarchs and royalty have assumed several regnal titles and styles throughout history.

Middle Ages

Regnal titles

Prince of Serbia / the Serbs
Archon of Serbia/Archon of the Serbs. ἄρχων (archon, plural , archontes) was used by the Byzantines as a generic title for "prince", "ruler". It is the only royal title that is known to have been used by and for Serbian monarchs during the rule of the Vlastimirović dynasty. The title in Serbian is rendered as knez.

Grand Prince of Serbia / the Serbs
The Serbian veliki župan (велики жупан) was the supreme chieftain in the multi-tribal society. The title signifies overlordship, as the leader of lesser chieftains titled župan. It was used by the Serb rulers in the 11th and 12th centuries. In Greek, it was known as archizoupanos ("chief župan") and megalos zoupanos or megazoupanos (μεγάλος ζουπάνος and μεγαζουπάνος, both meaning "grand župan").

King of Serbia / the Serbs

Great King of Serbia / the Serbs
The title was introduced in the 13th century. Stefan the First-Crowned, likely Stefan Uroš I, Stefan Dečanski and Stefan Dušan had the title.

Emperor of the Serbs (Цар Срба)
Emperor of the Serbs and the Greeks ("Emperor and autocrat of Serbia and Rhomania")

Despot of Serbia
The rulers of the Serbian Despotate were often mentioned as Lord of the Serbs, Despot. Used after 1402. Initially Despot was a honorific title of Byzantine origin (δεσπότης, despotes), used alongside that of the Lord of the Serbs, but eventually it became synonymous with the Serbian monarchy, as well as its claimants in exile.

Regnal styles of individual rulers

Stefan
The Nemanjić dynasty ruled the Serb lands between ca. 1166 up to 1371. All Serbian rulers after Stephen the First-Crowned added the name Stefan before their birth names after ascending the throne as a manner of honoring the first ruler of their dynasty, Stefan Nemanja. The name Stefan is derived from Greek stephanos, meaning crowned with wreath.

Vukan Nemanjić
In an inscription dating to 1202-1203, Vukan is titled as Grand Župan Vukan, Ruler of all Serbian lands, Zeta, maritime towns and land of Nišava.

Vukašin Mrnjavčević
Lord of the Serbian Land, of the Greeks, and of the Western Provinces.

Lazar Hrebeljanović
Autokrator of All Serbs Autokrator, "self-ruler" in Greek, was the title of the senior Byzantine emperor. The Nemanjić kings adopted it and applied it to themselves in its literal meaning to stress their independence from Byzantium, whose supreme suzerainty they nominally recognized.
"Prince of the Kingdom of Rascia" (in Hungary).

Modern
"Prince of Serbia" (see Principality of Serbia), in use 1817–82
"King of Serbia" (see Kingdom of Serbia), in use 1882–1918
"King of Serbs, Croats and Slovenes" (see Kingdom of Serbs, Croats and Slovenes), in use 1918–29
"King of Yugoslavia" (see Kingdom of Yugoslavia), in use 1929–45

See also
List of Serbian monarchs
Serbian noble titles
Style of the Serbian sovereign

References

Sources